Salyakhovo (Säläx) is a rural locality (a village) in Kanzafarovsky Selsoviet, Zilairsky District, Bashkortostan, Russia. The population was 161 as of 2010. There are 2 streets.

Geography 
Salyakhovo is located 21 km east of Zilair (the district's administrative centre) by road. Yumaguzhino is the nearest rural locality.

References 

Rural localities in Zilairsky District